Sócrates Cuauhtémoc Rizzo García (born September 14, 1945 in Linares, Nuevo León) is a Mexican politician affiliated with the Institutional Revolutionary Party (PRI). He is a former  federal Congressman (1985–1989), mayor of Monterrey (1989–1991) and former governor of Nuevo León (1991 – 1996).

He graduated from the Autonomous University of Nuevo León in 1969 with a bachelor's degree in economics and received master's degrees in the same discipline at El Colegio de México and at the University of Chicago.

He worked several years at the Secretariat of Finance and Public Credit and got elected to the Chamber of Deputies in  1988. After briefly chairing the state branch of the Institutional Revolutionary Party in Nuevo León (1988) he was elected mayor of Monterrey. He left the post to run for governor of the state and after a clear victory over his closest opponent he took office in 1991. As governor, Rizzo built the second line of Metrorrey and the state's largest water reservoir. He resigned from the post on April 18, 1996 after several political scandals involving some of his closest cabinet members.

After his resignation, Rizzo worked as visitor at Harvard and Duke. He also researched municipal decentralization for the government of Honduras.

Further reading
M. B. El-Hifnawi. 1998. Modeling the Determinants of Automobile Ownership in Developing Cities: The Case of Monterrey, Mexico. Cambridge, MA: Harvard Institute for International Development: Open Access Copy

References

1945 births
Living people
El Colegio de México alumni
Governors of Nuevo León
Institutional Revolutionary Party politicians
Members of the Chamber of Deputies (Mexico)
Municipal presidents of Monterrey
Mexican people of Italian descent
Politicians from Linares, Nuevo León
Autonomous University of Nuevo León alumni
Academic staff of the Monterrey Institute of Technology and Higher Education
Harvard University faculty
Duke University faculty
Harvard Institute for International Development
20th-century Mexican politicians
Deputies of the LIV Legislature of Mexico